Arterburn is a surname. Notable people with the surname include:

David K. Arterburn (born 1957), American judge
Elmer Arterburn (1929–2019), American football player
Norman Arterburn (1902–1979), Justice of the Indiana Supreme Court
Steve Arterburn (born 1953), American Christian author